Osvaldo Díaz (born 22 December 1981) is a retired Paraguayan footballer.

Career
Díaz began his career at Club Guaraní before moving in mid 2007 to Olimpia Asunción in the Paraguayan First Division.

On 1 February 2008 he was signed by AC Lugano, where he only played a total of 17 minutes in 3 games. 

On 4 August, before the Summer Olympics began, he played in a preparation game against the Portugal of Cristiano Ronaldo in the city of Algarve, resulting in a 5–0 defeat. Diaz was part of the silver medal-winning Paraguayan 2004 Olympic football team, which earned a quarter-final place with two victories in the qualifying round. Having finished second in the league, the squad later beat South Korea in the quarter-finals, and Iraq in the semi-finals, before losing to Argentina in the final.

References

External links

1981 births
Living people
People from San Lorenzo, Paraguay
Paraguayan footballers
Paraguay under-20 international footballers
Paraguay international footballers
Paraguayan expatriate footballers
Swiss Challenge League players
Paraguayan Primera División players
Club Guaraní players
Club Olimpia footballers
Sportivo Luqueño players
FC Lugano players
Club Sportivo San Lorenzo footballers
12 de Octubre Football Club players
Olympic footballers of Paraguay
Footballers at the 2004 Summer Olympics
Olympic silver medalists for Paraguay
Olympic medalists in football
Medalists at the 2004 Summer Olympics
Association football midfielders
Paraguayan expatriate sportspeople in Switzerland
Expatriate footballers in Switzerland